The Sculptor Wall is a superstructure of galaxies ("wall of galaxies") relatively near to the Milky Way Galaxy (redshift of approximately z=0.03), also known as the Sculptor superclusters.

The superstructure is also called the Southern Great Wall, the Great Southern Wall, or just the Southern Wall, in reference to the Northern Great Wall. The structure is 8000 km/s long (where km/s indicates the rate of expansion between two objects at the extents of a superstructure), 5000 km/s wide, 1000 km/s deep, in redshift space dimensions. Because these structures are so large, it is convenient to estimate their size by measuring their redshift; using a value of 67.8 for Hubble's Constant, the size of the structure is approximately 100 Mpc long by 70 Mpc wide by 10 Mpc deep.

The Grus Wall is "perpendicular" to the Fornax Wall and Sculptor Wall.

References

Galaxy filaments